NTV Jasmin is a Bosnian local commercial television channel based in Vitez, Bosnia and Herzegovina.
The program is mainly produced in Bosnian language.

References

External links 
 Official website (in Bosnian)

Television stations in Bosnia and Herzegovina
Television channels and stations established in 1998